St George's Anglican Church, also known as  or, simply  ('British Chapel'), is a small Anglican church located in the barrio of Recoletos, district of Salamanca, Madrid, Spain, which belongs to the Diocese in Europe of the Church of England. The church was built in 1923 and was consecrated in March 1925.

History 
The beginning of the church goes back to 1864, when the Anglican chaplain Reverend William Campbell was appointed to the British Embassy in Madrid, and held services in a small room in a private house. A few years later, larger premises were provided by the British and Foreign Bible Society. After the coach house of the old British Embassy being converted into a church in 1900, the funds raised through the bequest of Mr Edgar Allen and contributions from the English-speaking community, the groundbreaking for the present church took place in 1923. It was designed by the Spanish architect , who combined Spanish Romanesque and Mudéjar styles with specifically Anglican forms. The church was consecrated in 1925. Since then, it has grown into an English speaking international community with a congregation of some 26 nationalities.

Architecture 
The church is situated in a rectangular  and separated from the street by a small garden. Its designer, the Spanish architect Teodoro de Anasagasti, who blended elements of the traditional Spanish architecture, such as Spanish Romanesque and Mudéjar styles, with specifically Anglican forms, such as the porch or the chancel with its dossal.

The church is a single nave temple, parallel to the north–south direction, the transept, and a polygonal section forming the chancel, where the elevated altar is located. On the left a sacristy is located, a Mudéjar-style tower is erected beside the sacristy. The stained-glass windows in the chancel depict Saint George, patron of England, Saint James the Great, patron of Spain, Saint John, Saint Peter and Saint Paul. Those in the nave represent Saint David of Wales, Saint Andrew, patron of Scotland, Saint Patrick, patron of Ireland and Saint Francis of Assisi. In the north choir there are windows portraying Saint Cecilia and Saint Anthony Abbot, and in the porch, the Nativity of Christ.

Gallery

See also 
 Anglicanism in Spain
 Anglican Cathedral of the Redeemer
 Spanish Reformed Episcopal Church

References

External links
 
 

George Anglican
George
George
Madrid George
George
Churches completed in 1923
Neo-Mudéjar architecture in Spain
Romanesque Revival church buildings